is a Japanese ski mountaineer.

Yamada won the first Asian championship of ski mountaineering in 2007. Only the New Zealander Grant Guise topped his time, but did not count in the continental championship ranking because he was not an Asian country national.

References

External links 
 Seiji Yamada at SkiMountaineering.org
 Seiji Yamada at Hakuba47

1966 births
Living people
Japanese male ski mountaineers